Pomponius Bassus may refer to:

 Pomponius Bassus (consul 211), Roman senator and consul
 Pomponius Bassus (consul 259 & 271), Roman senator and consul
 Gaius Pomponius Bassus Terentianus, Roman senator and suffect consul c. 193
 Lucius Pomponius Bassus, Roman senator and suffect consul 118
 Titus Pomponius Bassus, Roman senator and suffect consul 94; see Galatia (Roman province)